Buddhist Wong Fung Ling College (BWFLC) is a secondary school in Causeway Bay, Wan Chai District, Hong Kong. It first opened in 1959. A government-aided school, it is sponsored by the Hong Kong Buddhist Association.

Campus
It has a student activity centre, a Chinese room, two halls, and an interactive laboratory.

Student body
Its students include Chinese and those from other countries, such as India, Indonesia, Pakistan, the Philippines, Thailand, and the United Kingdom.

References

External links

 Buddhist Wong Fung Ling College

1959 establishments in Hong Kong
Educational institutions established in 1959
Causeway Bay
Secondary schools in Hong Kong
Buddhist schools in Hong Kong
Hong Kong Buddhist Association schools